"How Can I Fall?" is a song by British band Breathe, written by the group members David Glasper and Marcus Lillington. It was released in June 1988 as the second single from their debut studio album, All That Jazz (1988). In the United Kingdom, "How Can I Fall?" was the third single from the album, following "Hands to Heaven" and the UK-only release "Jonah".

The song was successful in the United States where it peaked at #3 on the Billboard Hot 100 and #1 on the Billboard Adult Contemporary chart. Internationally, "How Can I Fall" reached the top 40 in the Belgium and Netherlands; however, in the United Kingdom it peaked solely at #48.

Charts

Weekly charts

Year-end charts

References

External links
Single release info at discogs.com
 

1987 songs
1988 singles
Breathe (British band) songs
Song recordings produced by Bob Sargeant
Virgin Records singles
A&M Records singles
1980s ballads
Rock ballads